2C-T-13 (2,5-dimethoxy-4-(β-methoxyethylthio)phenethylamine) is a psychedelic phenethylamine of the 2C family.  It was presumably first synthesized by Alexander Shulgin and reported in his book PiHKAL.

Chemistry
The drug has structural properties similar to mescaline and other drugs in the 2C-T series, with the most closely related compounds being 2C-T-7 and 2C-T-21.

General information
The dosage range of 2C-T-13 is typically 25 - 40 mg and its duration is approximately 6–8 hours according to Shulgin.  2C-T-13 produces many closed-eye visuals and geometric patterns.  It also produces slight visual distortion.

Pharmacology

The mechanism that produces 2C-T-13's hallucinogenic and entheogenic effects has not been specifically established; however, it is most likely to result from action as a 5-HT2A serotonin receptor agonist in the brain, a mechanism of action shared by all of the hallucinogenic tryptamines and phenethylamines for which the mechanism of action is known.

Dangers
The toxicity of 2C-T-13 is not well documented.  2C-T-13 is slightly less potent than 2C-T-7, but it may be expected that at higher doses it would display similar toxicity to that of other phenethylamines of the 2C-T family.

Legality
2C-T-13 is not scheduled in the United States, but possession and sales of 2C-T-13 could be prosecuted under the Federal Analog Act because of its structural similarities to 2C-T-7.

As of October 31, 2016, 2C-T-13 is a controlled substance (Schedule III) in Canada.

References

2C (psychedelics)
Thioethers